Mantak Chia (Chinese: 謝明德, Pinyin: Xiè Míngdé, born April 24, 1944 in Bangkok, Thailand) is a Taoist Master. Mantak Chia is the creator of the Healing Tao, Tao Yoga, Universal Healing Tao System, and Tao Garden Health Spa & Resort, located in the beautiful northern countryside of Chiang Mai, Thailand. The author of more than 60 books on Taoist practices, Mantak Chia has taught countless enthusiastic students the principles of Taoist internal arts over the past years. His books have been translated into more than 40 languages, which has made the Universal Healing Tao System global. He views himself primarily as a teacher.

Master Mantak Chia has been the only one named twice as Qigong Master of the Year by the International Congress of Chinese Medicine and Qi Gong in 1990 and 2012 and is also listed as number 18 of the 100 most Spiritually Influential people in The Watkins Review 2012.

Biography 

Mantak Chia was born to a Chinese family in Thailand in 1944. He was raised in a Christian household, with his grandfather a Baptist minister and his mother a missionary. He began studying the Buddhist method of "stilling the mind" at the age of six, and later studied Muay Thai boxing, T'ai chi ch'uan, Kung Fu and Taoist and Buddhist meditation practices from several masters. Of all his masters, the most influential one was Yi Eng (White Cloud), an eremitic member of the Dragon's Gate sect of the Quanzhen (Complete Perfection) school of Taoism (Chinese:  道家全眞龍門派), who taught Mantak Chia a complete Taoist training system and authorized him to teach and heal.

Later, he studied Western anatomy and medical science for two years to better understand the physiological mechanisms behind healing energy.

He established his first Universal Healing Tao school in Thailand in 1974 after systematizing his knowledge of Taoism. He founded the Universal Healing Tao Center (originally named the Taoist Esoteric Yoga Center) in New York in 1979. The center attracted a broad variety of European and American students, and some of them greatly helped him in teaching Taoist practices to western students. He returned to Thailand in 1994 and created the Universal Tao Training Center—Tao Garden—in Chiang Mai. He not only teaches at Tao Garden but also tours to other countries of the world to teach and promote the Healing Tao practices every year.

Spiritual Core 
Rooted in traditional Taoist practices, Chia's teaching system develops integrated physical, mental and spiritual (energy) bodies internal to human beings. The focus is on developing human life energy — Qi — for self-healing and life transformation.

Lineage 

Chia's lineage is that of the Dragon's Gate sect of the Quanzhen (Complete Perfection) school of Taoism (Chinese: 道家全眞龍門派). This sect takes the practical approach in studying Taoist Inner Alchemy (Chinese: 內丹實修派). It emphasizes knowledge and method that are effective to develop the states of inner experience and consciousness that are the birthright of all humans and accessible by all, without unnecessary rituals. After having inherited the complete Taoist internal spiritual cultivation system from his master, Yi Eng, Chia followed the master's instruction to teach it to others.

Nine Formulas 
The first two formulas are probably the most famous parts of Mantak Chia's teaching. However, they are not the core of the system. The purpose of the two formulas is to invoke one's awareness of qi, to strengthen it, and to open important qi channels in one's body, such as the governor and functional channels. These practices build a solid foundation for later formulas.

Sexual energy plays very important roles in qi cultivation. Taoist practitioners believe that the sexual energy accounts for a large part of the energy that a human body generates, and a person cannot achieve spiritual fulfillment without conserving and leveraging the power of the sexual energy. The first step of traditional inner alchemy (Chinese: 內丹) is transforming the material carrier of sexual energy (Jing) into Qi. The second formula lays a solid foundation for this purpose. However, because sex is a "hot" topic in a society, teaching sexual practices might be controversial.

The third formula, Fusion, really starts inner alchemy practices. Inner alchemy traditionally has three stages: transforming jing to qi, transforming qi to shen, returning shen to void. Qi and shen are inner life energies with shen being a more refined level, and both originate from the same original universe force. In Kan Li practices, one should have developed strong qi of all kinds so that intercourses of different qi take place resulting in a qi entity, call qi pearl (Chinese: 內丹), inside one's own body. This process is often described by the analogy of intercourses of a female and a male which leads to a fertilized egg. The intensive qi activities create an internal energy body which becomes the center of further practices, and eventually, the internal body leads to Tao, reaching immortality. Cultivating the internal body and merging into Tao are the central practices of Taoist inner alchemy, which require great dedication and determination.

Reception 
James Miller thinks that Mantak Chia's teachings of qi and cosmology is similar to the Taoist instructor Hua-ching Ni, but Chia's books lack discussion of philosophy, ethics or everyday practical advice. The system Chia presents is a narrowly focused system of Qi Gong rooted firmly in neidan.

Machacek and Wilcox think that Chia's study of Taoist sexuality has the trend in Taoist writings intended for a Western audience, a combination of theoretical knowledge and personal experience, which leads to a proliferation of subjective and modern "love manuals" and expositions on the Taoist way of love.

King's College scholar Peter B. Clarke thinks that Chia's Healing Tao is one of the few Thai new religious movements to have achieved an international following.

See also 
 Taoist sexual practices
 Dark retreat
 Iron shirt

References

Citations

Bibliography 
 Mantak Chia and Maneewan. Chi Nei Tsang: Internal Organ Chi Massage, 1990 .
 Clarke, John James. The Tao of the West: Western Transformations of Taoist Thought. Routledge, 2000. .
 Clarke, Peter Bernard. New religions in global perspective: a study of religious change in the modern world. Routledge, 2006. .
 Kohn, Livia. Chinese Healing Exercises: The Tradition of Daoyin. University of Hawaii Press, 2008. .
 Larthe, Christopher. "Mantak Chia – A Modern Taoist Master". Positive Health, July 1999 (Issue 42).
 Machacek, David W. & Wilcox, Melissa M. Sexuality and the world's religions. ABC-CLIO, 2003. .
 Chia, Mantak and Winn, Michael. "Taoist Secrets of Love – Cultivating Male Sexual Energy". Aurora Press, 1984. .
 Miller, James. Chinese religions in contemporary society. ABC-CLIO, 2006. .
 Chia, Mantak and Stone, Sarina. "Smiling Anatomy for Children, Level 1". Empowerment Through Knowledge, 2010. .
 Chia, Mantak and Stone, Sarina. "Smiling Anatomy for Children, Level 2". Empowerment Through Knowledge, 2010. .
 Chia, Mantak and Stone, Sarina. "Smiling Anatomy for Children, Level 3". Empowerment Through Knowledge, 2010. .

 Further reading 
 Chia, Mantak & Maneewan. Fusion of the Five Elements I: Basic and Advanced Meditations for Transforming Negative Emotions (Taoist Inner Alchemy Series). Healing Tao Books, 1991 (Reissue edition). 
 Chia, Mantak. Cosmic Healing I: Cosmic Chi Kung''. Universal Tao Publications, 2001. .

External links 
 

1944 births
Former Baptists
Living people
Mantak Chia
Mantak Chia
Taoist religious leaders